Momordicoside is any of several related cucurbitane triterpenoid glycosides that can be extracted from the bitter melon vine (Momordica charantia).  They include:

 Momordicoside A
 Momordicoside B
 momordicoside F1
 momordicoside F2
 Momordicoside K
 Momordicoside L
 Momordicoside M
 Momordicoside N
 Momordicoside S

Momordicosides A, B, F1, F2 K–N, and S can be extracted from the fruit with methanol.

See also 
 Charantoside
 Goyaglycoside
 Karaviloside

References 

Triterpene glycosides